William Henry Grey (December 22, 1829, in Washington, D.C. – November 8, 1888, in Helena, Arkansas) was a state legislator, storeowner and church leader in  Arkansas. He served in various elected and public offices in the state during the Reconstruction era. The Encyclopedia of Arkansas History and Culture calls Grey "a tireless fighter for the rights of freedmen." In 1868 he was among the first six African Americans who served in the Arkansas House. His gravesite in Magnolia Cemetery was listed on the National Register of Historic Places in 2019.

Biography
Grey was born a free person of color in December 1829 in Washington, D.C., and moved with his family to Pittsburgh, Pennsylvania, and then to Cincinnati, Ohio, in the 1840s. In 1852, as an adult, he moved to St. Louis, Missouri, and found work as a cook on Mississippi River steamboats.  In 1854, he wed Henrietta Winslow, who became the mother of his eight children. A member of the African Methodist Episcopal Church, he was called to the ministry and became an AME lay minister. At some point he moved his family south from Missouri to the Arkansas Delta, a region with which he would already have been familiar through his steamboat duties.

Reconstruction
In 1865, the closing year of the American Civil War, Grey lived in Helena, Arkansas and was the operator and part-proprietor of a grocery and bakery.  He participated in the Little Rock African-American convention that year, a gathering called to discuss the community's response to the ratification of the Thirteenth Amendment and the formal end of slavery in the United States.

In 1868, Grey was elected as a representative from Phillips County to the 1868 Arkansas Constitutional Convention, one of eight African-American delegates. The atmosphere of the 1868 convention was embittered by resentments stemming from the war.  A minority of delegates, described as "Conservatives," fought to prevent African-Americans from possessing the right to vote. Another issue was inter-racial marriage. Grey served on four of the convention's standing committees, including those dealing with education and the right to vote. The new Arkansas constitution was ratified statewide with Republican support.

As the new Arkansas government came into being, Grey's Phillips County neighbors elected him to the state legislature for the 1868–1869 term. Grey subsequently briefly filled a vacancy in the Arkansas Senate in 1875. Grey was elected clerk of the First Circuit Court and ex-officio Recorder of Deeds in 1870.  In 1872, he was a delegate to the 1872 Republican National Convention held in Philadelphia. He was selected to co-second the nomination of Ulysses S. Grant for a second term as U.S. President. His speech is believed to have been the first address spoken by an African American to a presidential nominating convention of a major U.S. political party.  Grey also, in 1872, took on the duties of Arkansas Commissioner of Immigration and State Lands, as the state had not yet been fully settled and was highly dependent upon additional immigrants.  He had to lay down these duties in 1874 after suffering a possible stroke. Grey returned to Helena and was selected as clerk of the Phillips County probate and county courts.

Jim Crow era
In the 1870s, severe reverses struck Grey.  The 1868 state constitution that he had helped to write was thrown out in 1874 and replaced by a new document, supported by many former Confederates. This constitution re-opened the door to Jim Crow government. In September 1878, Grey was paralyzed, an event believed to have been caused by a second and disabling stroke. The Democratic Party of Arkansas, which at that time was strongly oriented toward ex-Confederate interests, regained political control of Phillips County in the same year. This development permanently silenced Grey's voice in public affairs. He lived in obscurity until his death.

Legacy and honors
Grey was called by historian Harry Ashmore "the outstanding black leader of the period" in Arkansas.

Quote
 "We are here to receive the amount due us from the State of Arkansas.  Pay us, sir, the rights and privileges due us as citizens of the United States and the State of Arkansas."

References

1829 births
1888 deaths
African-American state legislators in Arkansas
African-American politicians during the Reconstruction Era
Businesspeople from Arkansas
Republican Party members of the Arkansas House of Representatives
Republican Party Arkansas state senators
People from Washington, D.C.
People from Pittsburgh
People from Cincinnati
People from St. Louis
People from Helena, Arkansas
People of the African Methodist Episcopal church
19th-century American politicians